Corwin Springs is an unincorporated community in Park County, Montana, United States. Its population was 109 as of the 2010 census. For statistical purposes, the United States Census Bureau has defined Saticoy as a census-designated place (CDP).

Demographics

References

Census-designated places in Park County, Montana
Census-designated places in Montana
Unincorporated communities in Montana
Unincorporated communities in Park County, Montana